V/H/S is an American horror anthology franchise that includes six found footage films, two spin-off films, and one miniseries. Created from an original story idea by Brad Miska, the plot centers around a number of disturbing VHS tapes that are discovered by innocent viewers and the possessive influence of the videos over those who see them. Realized by a collaboration of various filmmakers and different casts, the installments are mostly standalone in nature; though recurring elements indicate the same fictional villain as the source for all of its videos.

The original film, V/H/S, received mixed reviews, but was praised for its implementation of found-footage filmmaking and diverse stories, and was a financial success. The next two films in the franchise were met with similarly mixed reviews, and were not as financially successful as the first. Though the second film, V/H/S/2, was a success with film critics, it did not earn as much at the box office as its predecessor. The third installment, V/H/S: Viral, was poorly received critically, and made even less at the box office than the previous movie. Financial information has not been released for the remainder of the films in the franchise, but their critical reception has improved. The fourth film, V/H/S/94, received the most positive reviews of the franchise. The fifth movie, V/H/S/99, received lower but still generally positive ratings.

The spin-off film Siren serves as a continuation of one of the segments from the first film. It met with a mostly positive critical reception. The Snapchat released miniseries titled V/H/S: Video Horror Shorts, received praise for its short-form format and expansion of the franchise to new media.

The franchise will continue with the release of a second spin-off, Kids vs. Aliens and a sixth mainline installment V/H/S/85, both scheduled for release in 2023.

Origin

Created in a collaboration between Brad Miska and various filmmakers, the producer developed the concept for the overall premise of V/H/S with horror producer Roxanne Benjamin, who ran the ‘Bloody Disgusting Selects’ film distribution label at the time. Miska described the process as a "trust fall" exercise, with the creatives developing the initial premise, which he designates as a "wrap-around" of each film; followed by the additional segments that feature as the horrific video tapes that the characters in the recurring wrap-around sequences discover. Calling the franchise "a 'fill-in-the-hole' type project", Miska encouraged creativity from the respective filmmakers, with each segment being distinct in style and story.

Inspired by a history of experimental films, production on the first installment was developed as a potential submission for the Sundance Film Festival. With its chaotic post-production, the movie was submitted last-minute to the festival's deadline submission. Though a major risk creatively, the movie was accepted and premiered at the 2012 Sundance Film Festival. The film was positively received by critics and audiences, with praise directed at its cinematic format and creative variety. The Film Stage declared the release "a rejuvenation in the found footage area...a lively, well-constructed horror experiment"; notable given the production's chaotic, free-form development. Following its release and subsequent successes, a sequel was fast-tracked under the working title of "S-V/H/S", in reference to Super VHS tapes developed in 1987.

Though the franchise is structured as in an anthology format, recurring characters and scenes, as well as a continuing plot thread indicate that the sources of the videos will be revealed as the same threat. The movie launched a franchise, with a series of sequels, spin-offs, and a miniseries following thereafter.

Film 

†Faux-TV commercial embedded in the middle of the "Storm Drain" segment.

Main series

V/H/S (2012)

As a group of criminals record their crimes, they agree to a hire that asks them to break into a home to retrieve a specific VHS tape. As they commence their search they discover the home owner, an elderly man, has died while watching a series of tapes on his assortment of stacked televisions. As they continue to look for the requested video, each tape contains a sequence of terror recorded by home video camera. These recordings include: a group of friends who plan to meet some women at a club, only to be brutally attacked by a deadly siren; a vacation between a young couple and the lethal burglary of their hotel room; a group of friends who take a road trip to visit a secluded area in the woods and are faced with an unidentifiable murderous entity that appears as tracking errors on their camera; a video chat where a young woman contacts her med student boyfriend regarding an agitated bump on her arm, which is revealed to be the result of a tracking device placed within her by extraterrestrials who are conducting experiments on unknowing individuals; and a group of young men who attend a party on Halloween night only to arrive at the wrong house, and must face paranormal phenomena with poltergeists, and an exorcism conducted on a woman by a cult.

All the while unbeknownst to the thieves, one by one they begin to inexplicably disappear after each tape is viewed. Meanwhile, the deceased homeowner begins to reanimate and begins an attack on the remaining survivors.

V/H/S/2 (2013)

A mother hires a private investigator named Larry and his girlfriend Ayesha, to look for her college-age son named Kevin who has inexplicably gone missing. As the pair break into his dorm, they discover a stack of VHS tapes in his room, alongside a laptop computer that is in the middle of recording footage. After watching a clip of Kevin's recording on his computer, where he discusses the strange nature of these tapes and their influence on their viewer, Ayesha is tasked with watching the recorded videos while Larry continues to search the home for more evidence. Each tape includes a sequence of horror including: a man to attains a prototype ocular implant from his doctor, who is told that he may experience some glitches only to experience various encounters with ghosts; a cyclist's ride through a forested state park, who comes across a bloodied and ailing couple that reanimate after dying only to attack everyone around them into zombies; a documentary crew that visits an Indonesian cult to record their mysterious rituals, and finds themselves in the middle of a mass suicide all while a demon arrives to rule over its worshippers; and a group of friends who record their slumber party, only to be attacked by a number of aliens who seek to abduct the young boys.

As Ayesha watches the videos, an assortment of tapes that were first discovered by some thieves in an abandoned home, she becomes hypnotized before getting sick with a migraine headache. When her nose begins to bleed, Larry frantically looks for medication in the house. When he returns to help her, she has died. Another tape is left with an instructional message of "watch" written on it. As Larry presses play on the tape, a home video of Kevin and his mother relay that they want to make their own contribution to the series of videos. A figure from the shadows immerges revealing there is more to Kevin's disappearance than initially believed.

V/H/S: Viral (2014)

An amateur videographer named Kevin, continuously films the events of his life, including footage of his girlfriend named Iris. Though she is flattered by his encouraging compliments and his desire to document everything, she eventually grows concerned with his obsessive behavior. As the pair begin to argue, a news broadcast shows that a police chase involving an ice cream truck is taking place and about to go past their apartment. Kevin hurries outside to get some footage, hoping to create an online viral video, only to miss the car chase. Iris walks outside and into the road in a trance-like state before inexplicably disappearing. Kevin decides to pursue the ice cream truck, after disturbing images and video clips of a panicked Iris received on his cellphone, encourage him to do so. As his pursuit continues, other videos and images download to various people's phones, causing them to become insane and violent in nature. A series of the video recordings responsible for the chaos are revealed. The first video, interspersed with an investigative documentary detailing the rapid fame of Dante the Great prior to his disappearance, show that the magician rose to fame with the help of a cloak that once belonged to Harry Houdini, that is powered by paganistic sacrifices of innocent life to a demonic entity. In the second video clip, a man named Alfonso develops a device that opens a portal to a parallel dimension, and trades places with his exact duplicate to document the new reality, only to horrifically discover that the primary religion is Satanism, and the people who life there have fanged demonic faces in place of their genitalia. The last video details a group on young aspiring skateboarders who are coaxed into traveling to Tijuana to film more stunts, by a filmmaker that intends to shoot a snuff film. As the group encounters a cult in Mexico, they are pursued by the ritualists, monstrous creatures, skeletons, and a demonic entity.

As Kevin and the police continues to chase after the truck, onlookers attempt to film the pursuit only to fall victim to hypnotism caused by the videos that are appearing on their cellular devices, and operatic music that begins to play. Upon viewing these images and falling into a dazed state, their noses begin to bleed and they commit violent acts. When he finally comes across the abandoned ice cream truck, he is greeted inside by a number of stacked televisions that play a live video of Iris instructing him to push a button labeled "Upload" where all of the videos from the VHS tapes, originally discovered by some petty thieves in an abandoned home, will be submitted to the internet. Though he initially declines citing the disturbing acts of those who watch them, Iris begins to mutilate herself insisting that he complete the request. Deciding to save her life, Kevin uploads the videos only for the video of his girlfriend continuing to mock him. Having completed the desires of the unknown threat from the previous two film, he exits the truck, he finds that Iris is laying against it and has been dead for some time. Removing her phone from her mouth, his nose begins to bleed, after viewing the screen that displays the various videos. With the world now victim to viewing these clips, thousands are now committing horrific crimes, implying that all hope is lost.

Exclusive to home video release of the movie, a post-credits scene that is not found-footage in style like the rest of the V/H/S segments, shows that a covert operation is investigating the serial killer who is perhaps responsible for the events of each film.

V/H/S/94 (2021)

At a warehouse where cultist activities have been occurring, a SWAT team raids the building searching for the drugs and the originator of mass-suicides by its followers. As they discover prison-like cells, with stacks of televisions playing disturbing segments sourced from a number of VHS tapes. As the team searches each room, the horrific videos begin to play, including: a news report detailing the urban legend cryptid known as the "Rat Man" who lives in the sewers, only to be attacked by sewer-dwelling people who worship the humanoid and bring the news crew to it for sacrifice; a recording of a wake ceremony that is held for a man who committed suicide, only for his body to reanimate and attack his friends during an intense storm; an Indonesian crazed scientist who conducts experiments on unwilling subjects, with intent to create a mechanical-human hybrid race that serve as his troops under his command through brainwashing them, only for one of his experiments to turn on his other creations to protect a police troop investigating the laboratory; and a domestic terrorist group who believe they will rid America of its sin, use a vampire for its blood which explodes in the sun with plans to demolish a government building, only for the monster to break free and attack each of them. One of the team members in the video is revealed to be a part of the SWAT team raiding the building, who defeated the vampire just before he too was killed.

The rest of the SWAT team, tie him up and rebuke him for supplying an extremist group with weapons of war. The team questions what to do with him, as the women of the compound explain that they create snuff videos of animal cruelty, cannibalism, disturbing acts of violence, and other horrific segments.

V/H/S/99 (2022) 

In September 2021, producers announced that work has begun on the story for the next installment, while stating that whether it is green-lit depends on the success of V/H/S/94. In April 2022, Freddy Rodriguez stated on his social media profiles that he would be starring in a Shudder Exclusive Film tentatively titled "V/H/S/85". Rodriguez later deleted his post.

By July 2022, a sequel was confirmed officially titled V/H/S/99. The overarching plot will reportedly center around the final days of analog and the introduction of DVD media, and the paranoia surrounding Y2K. The anthology film will feature segments directed individually by Johannes Roberts, Vanessa & Joseph Winter, Maggie Levin, Tyler MacIntyre, and Steven "Flying Lotus" Ellison. Josh Goldbloom, Brad Miska, David Bruckner, Chad Villella, Matt Bettinelli-Olpin, Tyler Gillett, and James Harris will serve as producers. The project was developed as a joint-venture production between Bloody Disgusting, Cinepocalypse Productions, Radio Silence Productions, Studio71, and Shudder Original Films. The film will be released exclusively on Shudder via streaming.

V/H/S/99 premiered at the 2022 Toronto International Film Festival on September 16, 2022 and was released on October 20, 2022.

V/H/S/85 (2023) 

In April 2022, Freddy Rodriguez announced through his social media pages that he will star in an upcoming movie titled V/H/S/85. By October of the same year at the New York Comic Con, the project was officially announced to be in production. Taking place during 1985, the segments will be directed by David Bruckner, Scott Derrickson, Gigi Saul Guerrero, Natasha Kermani, and Mike P. Nelson, respectively; while Josh Goldbloom, Brad Miska, David Bruckner, Chad Villella, Matt Bettinelli-Olpin, Tyler Gillett, and James Harris will serve as producers. The project will be a joint-venture production between Bloody Disgusting Films, Radio Silence Productions, Studio71, Cinepocalypse, and Shudder Original Films.

V/H/S/85 is scheduled to be released in 2023, via streaming exclusively on Shudder.

Spin-off films

SiREN (2016)

A feature-length adaptation and continuation of the "Amateur Night" segment from V/H/S, the plot of the movie includes:

Jonah and his groomsmen plan a wild night of debaucherously clubbing activities for his bachelor party, one week prior to his wedding day. Organized by his irresponsible brother Mac and their best friends, the group finds themselves at a rundown uneventful strip club. Finding that Jonah is not happy, Mac hears of an underground brothel. Convincing his brother to go, the group drives through the night for an extended amount of time. Upon arriving at the location, they are all unnerved by the events inside the building and its patrons. Just as they're about to leave, the owner greets them and promises them a night they'll never forget, allowing each of them their own room. Because Jonah doesn't want any sexual encounters, he is given a room with a mysterious woman dancer named Lilith, chained up and behind glass. In conversing with her, he is convinced that she is an enslaved sex worker, and determines to break her out of the establishment. Working with his brother and friends, they escape the advances of security and free the woman.

As they drive away, they begin to realize that Lilith is not the timid and frail woman she seemed to be, but is instead a terrifying creature from legend known as a succubus, who will stop at nothing to claim her prey and take possession of Jonah.

Kids vs. Aliens (2022) 

A feature-length adaptation of the "Slumber Party Alien Abduction" segment of V/H/S/2, that was directed and co-written and edited by Jason Eisener. The filmmaker once again served as director from a script he co-wrote once again with John Davies; while Brad Miska, Josh Goldbloom, Jason Levangie, Marc Tetreault, and Rob Cotterill serve as producers. The plot is similar to the original segment, as it details the events of two siblings who must overcome their differences on Halloween night, when aliens attack and their parents are gone.

The project is a joint venture between Bloody Disgusting, Cinepocalypse Productions, Studio71, and Shudder Original Films. RLJE Films and Shudder served as distributors. Kids vs. Aliens had its premiere at Fantastic Fest 2022 on September 23, 2022. It was released exclusively via streaming on Shudder, on January 20, 2023. Eisener stated that there are tentative plans to make a sequel.

Television

A social media mini-series distributed an exclusive to Snapchat titled V/H/S: Video Horror Shorts, was released on October 28, 2018. Each episode detailed a different segment, similar to the videos depicted within the films.
Stray Dog: Casey Gustavo is throwing a slumber party with her friends Soon and Marta when they find a stray dog outside whom they name Drake. After convincing Casey's parents if they can keep him, they discover that he does not like bright lights and hides while also displaying glowing yellow eyes. Casey gives him a bath, where he suddenly attacks her. Soon and Marta check on Casey who is non-responsive and proceeds to eat everything in the fridge. Casey's father checks on her where she mutates into a monstrous creature who proceeds to attack and kill her parents and her friends.
Rearview Window: While her mom goes out to get pain medication, Jasmine rests in the backseat of her car with a broken leg. She watches various people passing by and comments on them until she sees a man forcibly kidnapping a woman and placing her in his van. Having been spotted, Jasmine begins to panic and is unsure if she is hallucinating from her medication. Eventually, her mother returns, but just as she calms down, she transforms into the kidnapper who blocks out the camera.
The Nest: Lily follows her brother Rob and new girlfriend Jenna into the woods to spy on them, as Rob is apparently cheating with her. Lily begins to find strange things littering the woods and comes across a domicile made of sticks. Upon entering, she sees Jenna feeding Rob a black liquid, claiming that someone is making her do it. Strange entities suddenly arrive and take Rob away for a supposed sacrifice. Jenna claims that he is supposed to be the last one as a way to prevent herself from turning into them. Lily suddenly finds herself surrounded by more entities as she is attacked, presumably, by a now transformed Jenna.
First Kiss: In the only non-found footage short, Drew and Allie get away from a party to have their first kiss with one another. Drew begins to notice some kind of ghostly being watching them that prevents him from kissing her. After hearing numerous noises and close calls, he leaves the room to tell the rest of the party goers to not interfere with him. He reenters and finds Allie calmly sitting on the side of the bed. As he leans in to kiss her, Allie suddenly enters to apologize and the two realize that the Allie on the bed is the ghost who lunges at Drew.

The series short-form format received positive reception, and praise for expanding the V/H/S premise into new territory.

Recurring cast and characters

Additional crew and production details

Reception

Box office performance

Critical and public response

Notes

References 

 
Horror film franchises
Film franchises introduced in 2012